An anterior or pectoral group consists of four or five glands along the lower border of the Pectoralis minor, in relation with the lateral thoracic artery.

Their afferents drain the skin and muscles of the anterior and lateral thoracic walls, and the central and lateral parts of the mamma; their efferents pass partly to the central and partly to the subclavicular groups of axillary glands.

Additional images

References

External links
 

Lymphatics of the upper limb